Goa Today is a monthly magazine published from Panjim (Panaji), the state-capital of Goa, India, since 1966, featuring news, literature and local issues. Goa Today is considered the "grand-daddy" of all monthly magazines in Goa. It was founded by Francisco Damasceno do Rosario Dantas and former joint-editor of Navhind Times, Lambert Mascarenhas, who was awarded the Gomant Vibhushan Award, the highest civilian award of Goa in 2014.

The main problem facing the magazine in the 2010s is fostering enough advertising to meet publication costs.

It was founded by Lambert Mascarenhas, now a centurion and F. D. Dantas. During Mascarenhas' and Dantas' ownership, Norman Dantas was first Associate editor and then as Executive editor for the magazine. When Goa Today was sold to Salgaocar Mining Industries, Mascarenhas was followed as editor by Vaman Sardesai, who left in 1987 to become India's ambassador to Angola. He was followed as editor by the poet-journalist Manohar Shetty, who maintained the high standards and promoted Goan literature while keeping the balance between history, political issues and literature. Vinayak Naik is the current editor.

In the mid 1980s, Goa Today was purchased by the Salgaocar Mining Industries, now part of the V. M. Salgaocar group of companies, which also own the Salgaocar Football Club of Goa.

References

External links
 
 

1966 establishments in Goa, Daman and Diu
English-language magazines published in India
Monthly magazines published in India
News magazines published in India
Magazines established in 1966
Mass media in Goa
Local interest magazines